The 2006 edition of R League was held from March 30 to October 26. 

Incheon United won the competition for the first time by defeating Busan I'Park in final on 26 October 2006.

League standing

Group A

Group B

Group C

Championship playoff

Semi-finals

Final
First leg

Second leg

External links
 R League 2006 table 

R League seasons
2006 in South Korean football